Half-space may refer to:
 Half-space (geometry), either of the two parts into which a plane divides Euclidean space
 Half-space (punctuation), a spacing character half the width of a regular space
 (Poincaré) Half-space model, a model of 3-dimensional hyperbolic geometry or higher-dimensional hyperbolic geometry using a Euclidean half-space
 Half-space model (oceanography), an estimate for seabed height in areas without significant subduction
 Siegel upper half-space, a set of complex matrices with positive definite imaginary part